Boomerang is a demo album by American pop rock group Hanson, released in March 1995. The album contains the original version of the song "More Than Anything", of which a live version was later included on the 1998 album Live from Albertane. The song "Lonely Boy" includes a short sample of "I'll Be There" by The Jackson 5.

Track listing
All songs were written by Isaac Hanson, Taylor Hanson and Zachary Hanson except where noted.
 "Boomerang" – 3:06
 "Poison Ivy" (The Coasters cover) – 3:00
 "Lonely Boy" – 4:02
 "Don't Accuse" – 2:48
 "Rain (Falling Down)" – 2:40
 "More Than Anything" – 6:07
 "The Love You Save" (The Jackson 5 cover) – 2:32
 "Back to the Island" (Baha Men cover) – 4:07
 "More Than Anything (Reprise)" – 4:38

References

1995 debut albums
Demo albums
Hanson (band) albums
Self-released albums